The Cunningham Mountains are a small mountain range on the southeastern coast of Devon Island, Nunavut, Canada. The Cunningham Mountains are part of the Devon Ice Cap which forms part of the Arctic Cordillera mountain range.

See also
List of mountain ranges

Mountain ranges of Qikiqtaaluk Region
Arctic Cordillera
Devon Island